Wattebledia crosseana is a species of freshwater snail with a gill and an operculum, an aquatic gastropod mollusk in the family Bithyniidae.

The specific name crosseana is in honor of French conchologist Joseph Charles Hippolyte Crosse.

Distribution 
The native distribution of this species includes:
 Thailand

References

External links 
 Chitramvong Y. P. (1991). "The Bithyniidae (Gastropoda: Prosobranchla) of Thailand: comparative internal anatomy. Walkerana 5(14): 161-206. PDF.

Bithyniidae
Gastropods described in 1886